The Rugrats Movie is a 1998 American animated comedy film based on the Nickelodeon animated television series Rugrats. It was directed by Igor Kovalyov and Norton Virgien and was written by David N. Weiss & J. David Stem. The film introduced Tommy Pickles' baby brother Dil Pickles, who appeared on the series the next year. The film features the voices of E. G. Daily, Tara Charendoff, Christine Cavanaugh, Kath Soucie, Cheryl Chase, Cree Summer, and Charlie Adler, along with guest stars David Spade, Whoopi Goldberg, Margaret Cho, Busta Rhymes, and Tim Curry. The events of the film take place between the series' fifth and sixth seasons, and is the first film to be based on a Nicktoon.

Plans for a Rugrats film adaptation, along with Ren and Stimpy and Doug, began when Nickelodeon made a contract with 20th Century Fox to produce films between 1993 and 1995. However, the contract expired with no films into production. Around the same year when the contract expired, development of the film restarted with Paramount Pictures since Nickelodeon's parent company, Viacom, purchased the studio in 1994 and production had restarted on the television series after a small hiatus.

The Rugrats Movie was released by Paramount Pictures in the United States on November 20, 1998. The film received mixed reviews from critics and opened at #1 in the United States box-office. Grossing a total of $141 million worldwide, it became the first non-Disney animated film to gross over $100 million in the United States. The film is followed by two sequels: Rugrats in Paris: The Movie in 2000 and Rugrats Go Wild in 2003.

Plot

Didi Pickles is pregnant with her second baby, which makes her son Tommy worry how that will change the family dynamic. When the baby comes unexpectedly early, despite being told it will be a girl, Didi gives birth to a boy she and her husband Stu name Dil. When they bring him home, they find themselves struggling to cope with Dil's constant outbursts and Tommy finds his new brother hard to get along with. After Stu assures him one day they will be happy to have Dil in the family, Tommy accepts his newfound responsibility as an older brother.

With Dil still causing problems at the Pickles' home, Phil and Lil suggest using the Reptar Wagon Stu has built for a toy contest in Japan to take him back to the hospital. As Tommy and Chuckie argue with Phil and Lil, Angelica walks in telling the babies to be quiet. In the process, Dil snatches her Cynthia doll from her and she fights Dil to get her back, unaware that she failed to get Cynthia back she kicks the Reptar wagon which begins to drive away the babies on board. They speed recklessly through the streets and land in the back of a mattress van which after avoiding a collision later crashes in the woods, it is then that they realize that they are lost. At first, Angelica shows no concern until she finds out that the babies have stolen her Cynthia doll, which prompts her to take the family dog, Spike, to find them and retrieve Cynthia.

Tommy leads the babies toward a ranger's cabin, believing it to be the home of a magic "lizard" (a mispronunciation of wizard) who can grant their wish to go home. Unbeknownst to them, they are being pursued and hunted down by a bloodthirsty, ferocious wolf. On the way, they encounter monkeys who hijacked their circus' train and crashed it in the woods. When they kidnap Dil, Tommy's friends refuse to help rescue him, believing they are better off without him and Tommy sets off after his brother alone. Meanwhile, Stu discovers that the babies are missing and he, plus Grandpa, race to the airport, believing that they were accidentally inside the crate when it was picked up to be flown to Japan. After Didi discovers that the babies are missing, they set out to find them in the face of the media sensation that has suddenly generated around their children's disappearance. Drew and Charlotte arrive and Drew learns from Rex Pester that his brother lost his daughter Angelica, causing Drew to attack Stu.

Tommy eventually finds Dil during a storm, but as he struggles to take care of him, Dil continues acting selfishly. Tommy eventually loses his temper and prepares to give Dil back to the monkeys, but his rage scares Dil into ending his behavior. At the same time, Dil's tears cause Tommy to calm down and the brothers finally begin to bond. After the storm, they are reunited with Phil, Lil and Chuckie who, upon having a change of heart, stop the monkeys from trying to take away Tommy and Dil. Angelica finds her Cynthia doll after one of the monkeys drops it and then reunites with the babies. As they begin to cross a damaged bridge, Angelica falls out of the Reptar wagon and hangs through a gap in the bridge above a raging river. They are then confronted by the monkeys, only for them to be scared off by the wolf, who attempts to attack the babies until Spike intervenes and fights the wolf before dragging it off the bridge through a hole into the river, sacrificing himself in the process. The babies all become sad when it seems that Spike is dead.

Stu, looking for the babies in a pterodactyl-like glider, sees them from above and crash lands into the ranger's cabin. Believing he is the "lizard", the babies ask him to bring Spike back instead of going home. Stu falls through the bridge and reveals Spike, who survived the fall by landing in the struts of the bridge. The children are all reunited with their parents and return home, where they accept Dil as one of the group.

Voice cast

Main
 E. G. Daily as Tommy Pickles
 Tara Charendoff as Dil Pickles
 Christine Cavanaugh as Chuckie Finster
 Kath Soucie as Phil, Lil, and Betty DeVille
 Cheryl Chase as Angelica Pickles
 Jack Riley as Stu Pickles
 Melanie Chartoff as Didi Pickles and Grandma Minka
 Michael Bell as Drew Pickles, Chas Finster and Grandpa Boris
 Tress MacNeille as Charlotte Pickles
 Philip Proctor as Howard DeVille, Igor
 Joe Alaskey as Grandpa Lou Pickles

Guest
 David Spade as Ranger Frank
 Whoopi Goldberg as Ranger Margaret
 Tim Curry as Rex Pester
 Hattie Winston as Dr. Lucy Carmichael
 Andrea Martin as Aunt Miriam
 Cree Summer as Susie Carmichael
 Tony Jay as Dr. Lipschitz
 Busta Rhymes as Reptar Wagon
 Roger Clinton, Jr. as Air Crewman
 Margaret Cho as Lt. Klavin
 Edie McClurg as Nurse
 Charlie Adler as United Express Driver
 Gregg Berger as Circus Television Announcer
 Abraham Benrubi as Serge

Baby singers
 Lenny Kravitz
 Iggy Pop
 Lisa Loeb
 Gordon Gano
 B-Real
 Patti Smith
 Jakob Dylan
 Phife Dawg
 Beck
 Lou Rawls
 Dawn Robinson
 Laurie Anderson
 Fred Schneider, Kate Pierson and Cindy Wilson of The B-52's without member Keith Strickland

Production
Talks about making Rugrats into a feature film existed since the beginning of the series. The first attempt was in 1993, when Nickelodeon made a two-year contract deal with 20th Century Fox to produce new material, but an unnamed Nickelodeon executive did not rule out the possibility to make films based on their existing properties, one of those that was proposed was Rugrats, alongside Doug and The Ren & Stimpy Show. However, in 1994, Nickelodeon's parent company Viacom acquired Paramount Pictures, and Paramount would distribute the films instead. As a result, the contract from Fox expired, with no films produced (although Doug would eventually get a theatrical film from Walt Disney Pictures in 1999). Production on The Rugrats Movie started a year later in 1995.

Two months before the release of the movie, an episode prequel titled "The Family Tree" was aired as the final episode of the fifth season. The film's beginning and ending parody Paramount and Lucasfilm's Indiana Jones film series. This later inspired the second segment of the episode "A Tale of Two Puppies / Okey-Dokey Jones and the Ring of the Sunbeams", that aired during the show's eighth season in 2002.

This film was the first Rugrats production to use digital ink and paint, rather than the traditional cel animation used in the show.

Two songs were cut from the film during production. The first revolves around Stu and Didi in a nightmare sequence where Dr. Lipschitz criticizes their parenting through a song. The second depicts the Rugrats pushing the Reptar Wagon through the woods, debating what to do about Dil in an army chant style song. These two scenes were cut from the theatrical, VHS,  DVD, and Laserdisc releases. However, these scenes are shown on CBS and Nickelodeon television airings of the film. These scenes were also present in the print novelization.

The film was released in theaters with a CatDog short titled "Fetch". This short was later broadcast in CatDog Episode 21. However, the VHS, DVD, Laserdisc, and Blu-ray (through The Rugrats Trilogy Movie Collection) release contains a different CatDog short from Episode 28 titled "Winslow's Home Videos".

Media

Home media
The Rugrats Movie was released on VHS and DVD on March 30, 1999 by Paramount Home Video. The film was also released on Laserdisc on the same day by Pioneer Entertainment. On March 15, 2011, the film was re-released in a three-disc trilogy DVD set alongside its sequels, in honor of Rugrats''' 20th anniversary. In addition, it was re-released in some movie sets by Paramount, in 2016 with all the non-sequel Nickelodeon-animated movies up to Barnyard, as well as a separate 2-disc set with Hey Arnold!: The Movie. The film was released on Blu-ray on March 8, 2022 in a trilogy set alongside its sequels.

SoundtrackThe Rugrats Movie: Music from the Motion Picture was released by Interscope Records on November 3, 1998. The enhanced soundtrack contained thirteen tracks, bonus CD-ROM demos and commercials. Amazon.com's Richard Gehr praised the CD for "[bridging] demographics as nimbly as the [original] show itself [did]" and for songs "fans of all ages will love".Entertainment Weeklys David Browne rated the Music From the Motion Picture with a C.

Browne noted that, while the soundtrack is enjoyable for children and does "[make] concessions" for parents, adults may dislike the amount of rap. Allmusic's William Ruhlmann reviewed the soundtrack positively, saying "the result" of the singers and songs "is a romp in keeping with the tone of the show and the film".The Rugrats Movie: Music from the Motion Picture spent twenty six weeks on Billboard 200, peaking at #19.

One song written for the film's soundtrack that was ultimately removed was "(Safe in This) Sky Life", a new track by English rock musician David Bowie; the song marked a reunion with longtime collaborator Tony Visconti, who would go on to produce all of Bowie's material from 2002 up until his death in 2016. The track would later be re-recorded as a B-side for Bowie's 2002 single "Everyone Says 'Hi'", under the shortened title of "Safe". The original 1998 recording remains unreleased and has never been circulated.

In honor of its twentieth anniversary, the film's soundtrack was released on vinyl on November 30, 2018.

Track listing

Video games
A side-scrolling video game titled The Rugrats Movie was released for Game Boy and Game Boy Color in 1998 and 1999 respectively. It was developed by Software Creations and released by THQ. Broderbund also developed and published a video game based on the film: The Rugrats Movie: Activity Challenge. It was released in September 1998, as part of the film's marketing campaign.

Books
Several books were released by Simon & Schuster's Simon Spotlight branch and Nickelodeon inspired by The Rugrats Movie. Tommy's New Playmate and The Rugrats Versus the Monkeys were also released on October 1, 1998, authored by Luke David and illustrated by John Kurtz and Sandrina Kurtz.The Rugrats Movie Storybook, released on the same date and using the same illustrators and publishers, was written by Sarah Wilson. The same date saw the release of The Rugrats Movie: Hang On To Your Diapies, Babies, We're Going In!: Trivia from the Hit Movie!, a trivia book written by Kitty Richards.

A novelization of the film written by Cathy East Dubowski was published on October 1, 1998, by Tandem Library. The following month, a 144-page guidebook, The Making of The Rugrats Movie: Behind the Scenes at Klasky Csupo, was released on November 1, 1998, by MSG. In May 1999, Hal Leonard Publishing Corporation released a book titled The Rugrats Movie.

Reception

Box office
The film was released on November 20, 1998, and made $27.3 million in its opening weekend, from 2,782 theaters, averaging about $9,821 per venue and ranking number one that weekend, beating out Enemy of the State. In total, The Rugrats Movie made $140.9 million; $100.5 million from the domestic market and $40.4 million from its foreign release.

The film was released in the United Kingdom on March 26, 1999, and topped the country's box office for the next three weekends, before being dethroned by The Faculty.

Critical reception
The website's critics consensus reads: "Charming characters; loads of fun for kids and adults." Metacritic gave the film 62% based on the 20 reviews. Audiences polled by CinemaScore gave the film an average grade of "A−" on an A+ to F scale.

Roger Ebert gave the film two stars out of four. Ebert wrote that the film's target audience was primarily younger children, and that, while he as an adult disliked it, he "might have" liked it if he were younger and would recommend it for children. The New York Timess Anita Gates reviewed The Rugrats Movie positively, calling it a "delight". Neil Jeffries of Empire gave the film three out of five stars, saying, "Fun for kids, but, despite some adult references, appeal for the over 10s is limited."

Lisa Schwarzbaum of Entertainment Weekly graded the film with a B. Schwarzbaum praised the movie for its appeal to both adult and child audiences, "juxtaposing the blithely self-absorbed parallel universes of small, diapered children and their large, Dockered parents". However, other Entertainment Weekly reviewer Ty Burr gave The Rugrats Movie a B−, criticizing that the film's issues sprung from it being "bigger" than the original series, thus it having more cultural references, out-of-place CGI scenes, and "[going] into scary territory". Burr did praise the "escaped circus monkeys" for being "scary in a good way", as well as a joke that was accessible to younger audiences.Rugrats co-creator and co-writer Paul Germain (who, along with the other original writers, left the series in 1993) has stated that he disliked the film's story. Germain felt that the film's writers did not understand what the series was about, and thought that the scene in which Stu gives a watch to Tommy did not work as the adults were not supposed to recognize the babies' intelligence. In addition, he felt that by giving Tommy a baby brother, Tommy was no longer the baby, which changed the story of the series from what Germain intended it to be.

Sequels
Two sequels have been released: Rugrats in Paris: The Movie, which was released on November 17, 2000, and Rugrats Go Wild'', which was released on June 13, 2003.

References

External links

 
 
 
 
 
 

1998 films
1998 animated films
1990s adventure comedy films
1990s American animated films
American adventure comedy films
American children's animated adventure films
American children's animated comedy films
American children's animated musical films
American musical comedy films
Animated films based on animated series
Films scored by Mark Mothersbaugh
Films about babies
Animated films about brothers
Films about missing people
Klasky Csupo animated films
Nickelodeon animated films
Nickelodeon Movies films
Paramount Pictures animated films
Paramount Pictures films
Rugrats (franchise)
Rugrats (film series)
Films set in forests
Films with screenplays by David N. Weiss
1998 directorial debut films
1998 comedy films
1990s English-language films
Films directed by Norton Virgien
Films directed by Igor Kovalyov